Ranieri is an Italian surname and given name originated from the masculine Germanic given name Ragnar (Old Norse Ragnarr).

Surname
Teodorico Ranieri (b. unknown, d. 1306), Italian cardinal of the Roman Catholic Church
Massimo Ranieri (born 1951), Italian pop singer and actor
Claudio Ranieri (born 1951), Italian professional football player and manager
Nik Ranieri, animator at Walt Disney Studios
Jeff Ranieri (born 1978), American meteorologist
Lewis Ranieri (born 1947), American bond trader, pioneer of securitization
Sem De Ranieri (b. 1888, d. 1979), Italian sports shooter.
Antony Ranieri (born 1977), Professional footballer
Katyna Ranieri (b. 1928, d. 2018), Italian singer
Miranda Ranieri (born 1986), Canadian squash player
Silvio Ranieri (b. 1882, d. 1956), Italian mandolin player and virtuoso

Given name
 Rainerius (c. 1117–c. 1160), Saint Ranieri, Pisan saint.
 Renier of Montferrat (1162–1183),  son-in-law of Byzantine Emperor Manuel I Komnenos. In Italian, Ranieri del Monferrato.
 Rainier, Marquess of Montferrat (c. 1084-1135), Ranieri I del Monferrato or Marchesato del Monferrato, ruler of the state of Montferrat in north-west Italy from about 1100 to his death.
 Ranieri, Count Di Campello (b. 1908, d. 1959), Italian equestrian, military officer, sport manager and nobleman.
 Ranieri del Pace (b. 1681, d. 1738), Italian baroque painter
 Ranieri Campello (born 1962), Italian equestrian
 Ranieri of Viterbo (b.1180, d. 1250), Italian cardinal and military leader, also known as Raniero Capocci
 Prince Ranieri, Duke of Castro (b. 1883, d. 1973), claimant of the house of Bourbon and Duke of Castro
 Ranieri III Grimaldi of Monaco  (b. 1923, d. 2005), Prince of Monaco
 Ranieri of Pisa (b. 1115, d. 1160), Patron Saint of Pisa 
 Ranieri de' Calzabigi (b. 1714, d. 1795), Italian librettist, famous for his collaborations with composer Christoph Willibald Gluck

Italian-language surnames
Masculine
Italian masculine given names